The Esther Williams Trophy is one of two trophies that have circulated among ships of various navies, after originating in the Royal Australian Navy (RAN). Stevenson wrote on a photograph of Esther Williams, "To my own Georgie, with all my love and a passionate kiss, Esther"; Brand (aka "George") put the screen idol over his bed. The photo was taken to another ship by a fellow officer, and the "trophy" was then circulated by officers among some 200 other ships including in United States Navy, Royal Navy, and Royal Canadian Navy ships in Asian waters. 

The original photo became the "trophy copy" to be kept in a safe location. After the "fighting copy" had been successfully removed from the custodial ship, the "trophy copy" would be presented to the new owners with appropriate ceremony. At various times, the holders of the trophy have either flown an Esther flag or sent naval signals (signed "Esther") to other nearby ships to indicate where the trophy resided. In 1946, an officer from  started a tradition when he composed the "Esther Rescued" signal (indicating the trophy's changing of hands) in poetry.

In 1957, "Esther" was retired by the United States Navy and sent to the RAN's Naval Historical Collection at Spectacle Island in Sydney. A documentary about the trophy's history was produced in 2007.

Following the death of Esther Williams in June 2013, the trophy was officially retired.

References

Royal Australian Navy